Bowdre is a surname. Notable people with the surname include:

Charlie Bowdre (1848–1880), American cowboy and outlaw
Karon O. Bowdre (born 1955), American judge

See also
Bowdre, Mississippi
Bowdre Township, Douglas County, Illinois